Adèle Euphrasie Barbier (religious name Mother Mary of the Heart of Jesus) (4 January 1829 – 18 January 1893) was a New Zealand Roman Catholic religious sister, teacher and founder of a congregation of religious sisters.

Adèle was born in Caen, France, on 4 January 1829. Adèle Euphrasie Barbier was the founder of Congregation of Our Lady of the Missions.
She worked in a laundry when she was 13 and opened her own laundry at home when she was 17.
She died in Westbere, Kent, England on 18 January 1893.

Ever since she was a little girl Euphrasie had wanted to be a missionary. At 19 years of age she set off to Paris to join the congregation of the Sisters of Calvary which was just founded in 1840 by Fr Nicolas Chantome. On 6 August 1849 she became Sister Marie of the Heart of Jesus.

References

1829 births
1893 deaths
New Zealand educators
19th-century New Zealand Roman Catholic nuns
French Servants of God
19th-century venerated Christians
French emigrants to New Zealand
Clergy from Caen